Borislav (Boki) Jovanović (born 16 August 1986) is a professional Serbian football player.

He moved to Ergotelis from Serbian club FK Inđija on 1 June 2011.

References

External links
Ergotelis squad at superleaguegreece.net, ΓΙΟΒΑΝΟΒΙΤΣ ΜΠΟΡΙΣΛΑΒ 

1986 births
Living people
Serbian footballers
Association football central defenders
FK Srem players
FK Inđija players
Ergotelis F.C. players
Athlitiki Enosi Larissa F.C. players
FC Urartu players
Super League Greece players
Armenian Premier League players
Serbian expatriate footballers
Expatriate footballers in Greece
Expatriate footballers in Armenia